Pirojpur is a town in Pirojpur district in the division of Barisal in southern Bangladesh. It is the administrative headquarter and the largest town of pirojpur district.

References

Towns in Bangladesh
Municipalities of Bangladesh
Populated places in Pirojpur District